Reicke is a surname. Notable people with the surname include:

 Bo Reicke (1914 – 1987), Swedish biblical scholar
 Georg Reicke (1863-1923), German politician, Second mayor of Berlin from 1903-1920
 Rudolf Reicke (1825—1905), German historian and scholar

German-language surnames